The 2000 San Francisco 49ers season was the franchise's 51st season in the National Football League and their 55th overall. Jerry Rice entered the 2000 season as the oldest player in the league at the wide receiver position. At the end of the year, however, with the emergence of Terrell Owens, Rice decided to leave the team after sixteen seasons to join the Raiders. Running back Charlie Garner would join Rice in Oakland.

The 49ers improved from 4–12 in 1999 to 6–10, but still suffered back-to-back losing seasons for the first time since their four consecutive losing seasons from 1977 to 1980.

Without Steve Young, who retired after the 1999 season, the 49ers fully relied on second-year quarterback Jeff Garcia, who enjoyed his best year and was named to the Pro Bowl at the end of this season.

Offseason

2000 NFL Draft

Personnel

Staff

Roster

Regular season

Schedule

Season summary

Week 1 at Atlanta Falcons 
Jeff Garcia opened scoring on a four-yard touchdown to Fred Beasley but after four consecutive Morten Anderson field goals the Falcons got touchdown catches from Terance Mathis and Shawn Jefferson while Ashley Ambrose picked off Garcia and scored. Beasley and Terrell Owens caught additional San Francisco touchdowns in the 36–28 loss.

Week 2 vs. Carolina Panthers 
San Francisco's home opener was a disaster as four straight Panthers touchdowns ultimately led to a 38–22 Niners loss. With the game out of reach Garcia was benched and former Seahawks washout Rick Mirer completed a touchdown to J. J. Stokes and a two-point conversion throw to Owens on a subsequent Fred Beasley score.

Week 3 at St. Louis Rams 
The Niners led 10–3 and closed to 27–24 but the defending Super Bowl champs put the game away 41–24. Garcia was intercepted twice, the second time at the Rams goal line with 47 seconds to go.

Week 4 at Dallas Cowboys 

 Charlie Garner 36 Rush, 201 Yds

 Terrell Owens poses on the midfield star

This was the game famous for Terrell Owens posing on the Cowboys mid-field star after his first touchdown of the game. This led to a more emphatic gesture by Emmitt Smith when he scored as he slammed the ball securely to the star. When Owens scored again he repeated his gesture then was hammered by George Teague in response.

Though the Niners won 41–24 it was a costly affair for coach Steve Mariucci; not only was Owens suspended for their following game (creating a rift between the two) but Mariucci clashed with an enraged Jerry Rice during the game, Rice angry after coming into the game with only eleven catches – in a bigger irony Rice would catch two touchdowns.

Week 5 vs. Arizona Cardinals 
The Niners led wire to wire in winning 27–20. Jerry Rice led Niners receivers with seven catches for 66 yards and a touchdown.

Week 6 vs. Oakland Raiders 
The two Bay Area NFL teams met for only the ninth time and first since the Raiders returned to Oakland. After two Sebastian Janikowski field goals the Niners took a 14–6 lead on scores to Owens and Rice. In the third after a Tyrone Wheatley score and two pointer tied the game the Raiders forced a fumble, completed a deep strike to Andre Rison, then Tim Brown caught a 30-yard score. The Raiders next scored on a Rich Gannon run. Garcia then completed a touchdown to Owens where he outmaneuvered five Raiders defenders. A missed Janikowski attempt led to the tying Niners score. In overtime Janikowski missed again but Wade Richey’s kick was blocked and in the ensuing Raiders drive Brown caught the game-winning touchdown (34–28 final).

Week Seven at Green Bay Packers 
San Francisco’s perennial struggle against the Packers continued in a competitive game as Jeff Garcia threw four touchdowns in erasing a 21–7 gap then tying the game at 28 in the final five minutes. The Packers faced third down only once on their final field goal drive and Garcia’s final pass to Charlie Garner reached the Packers 28.

Week Eight at Carolina Panthers 
The Niners in a 34–16 loss were swept for the second straight season, second time by their former coach, and third time in the six seasons of the Panthers’ existence. Steve Beuerlein had three touchdown throws while Garcia had two scores and also a pick six by the Panthers' Mike Minter.

Week Nine vs. St. Louis Rams 
With Trent Green forced to start in Kurt Warner's stead the Rams at Candlestick Park had themselves a battle as the Niners led four different times and Terrell Owens caught two scores. Green's score to Marshall Faulk in the third tied the game then after an exchange of punts Faulk caught another score. A Pete Stoyanovich field goal made for a 34–24 Niners loss.

Week Ten at New Orleans Saints 
Former Bengals washout Jeff Blake threw three touchdowns and led five scoring drives to a 31–0 Saints lead, enough to absorb 15 points by the Niners who fell to 2–8 while the long-luckless Saints reached 6–3.

Week Eleven vs. Kansas City Chiefs 
The Niners ended their five-game slide and a two-game slide against Kansas City by scoring three times on the ground (by Charlie Garner and Jeff Garcia) in the second quarter, limiting the Chiefs to one touchdown while intercepting former 49ers quarterback Elvis Grbac once.

Week Twelve vs. Atlanta Falcons 
Jason Webster’s 70-yard pick six was the lone touchdown amid five field goals by both teams as the Niners ground out a 16–6 win. San Francisco sacked Chris Chandler four times.

Week Fourteen at San Diego Chargers 
The Niners had an easy time of it, winning 45–17 as they intercepted Ryan Leaf four times. Watching from the sidelines was Leaf’s backup and a future Niners head coach, while Jerry Rice, embroiled in a salary cap dispute with the Niners front office, caught what would be his final two scores with the team that drafted him.

Week Fifteen vs. New Orleans Saints 
The Saints were on their way to their best season in nearly a decade and took an important step in a 31-27 comeback win at San Francisco. Following a 69-yard Garcia touchdown to Terrell Owens the Saints mounted two touchdown drives and Garcia was intercepted with 23 seconds remaining.

Week Sixteen vs. Chicago Bears 
Rumor of a Jerry Rice divorce from the Niners would come true subsequently as San Francisco’s last home game of the season saw a ceremony honoring Rice and Flash 80 caught seven passes for 76 yards. But it would be Terrell Owens who made history with twenty catches, setting a new NFL single-game record previously held by Tom Fears in 1950.

Week Seventeen at Denver Broncos 
The Niners’ disappointing season ended in ugly fashion as the playoff-bound Broncos erupted to lead 38–0. The Niners ended their season and a 38–9 loss on a Garcia touchdown to J. J. Stokes in the final minute.

Standings

Awards and records 
 Jeff Garcia, Franchise Record, Most Passing Yards in One Season, 4,278 Passing Yards
 Charlie Garner, Franchise Record, Most Rushing Yards in One Game, 201 Rushing Yards (September 24, 2000) 
 Terrell Owens, Franchise Record, Most Receptions in One Game, (20) (December 17, 2000) 
 Terrell Owens, NFL Record, Most Receptions in One Game, (20) (December 17, 2000)

References

External links
 2000 49ers on Pro Football Reference
 49ers Schedule on jt-sw.com

San Francisco 49ers
San Francisco 49ers seasons
2000 in San Francisco
San